Joseph  or Giuseppe Ruffini (1690 - February 7, 1749) was an Italian-Austrian painter, mainly active in Germany.

Biography
He was born in Merano in the Tyrol. He trained with his father, and by 1711 he had moved to work in Munich in Bavaria.  He is best known for his late-Baroque cycle of paintings for the Ottobeuren Abbey. He died in Bavaria.

References

1690 births
1749 deaths
People from Merano
18th-century Italian painters
Italian male painters
Italian emigrants to Austria
18th-century Italian male artists